Ankireddy Pally is a village in Kurnool district in Andhra Pradesh, India. It falls under owk mandal.

References

Villages in Ranga Reddy district